There were two important chess tournaments held in San Sebastián, Spain, in 1911 and 1912.

San Sebastián 1911
The tournament was held from February 20 to March 17, 1911.  The event was organized by Jacques Mieses, who insisted that all of the expenses of the masters were paid.

{|class="wikitable" style="margin:  "
|  style="background:#f0f0f0;"|#
|  style="background:#f0f0f0;"|Player
|  style="background:#f0f0f0;"|1
|  style="background:#f0f0f0;"|2
|  style="background:#f0f0f0;"|3
|  style="background:#f0f0f0;"|4
|  style="background:#f0f0f0;"|5
|  style="background:#f0f0f0;"|6
|  style="background:#f0f0f0;"|7
|  style="background:#f0f0f0;"|8
|  style="background:#f0f0f0;"|9
|  style="background:#f0f0f0;"|10
|  style="background:#f0f0f0;"|11
|  style="background:#f0f0f0;"|12
|  style="background:#f0f0f0;"|13
|  style="background:#f0f0f0;"|14
|  style="background:#f0f0f0;"|15
|  style="background:#f0f0f0;"|Total
|-
| 1 ||  || * ||0 ||½ ||½ ||½ ||½ ||1 ||1 ||1 ||½ ||½ ||1 ||1 ||½ ||1 ||  9½
|-
| 2 ||    ||  1 ||* ||½ ||½ ||½ ||½ ||½ ||½ ||½ ||½ ||½ ||1 ||½ ||1 ||1 ||  9
|-
| 3 ||    || ½  ||½ ||* ||0 ||½ ||½ ||½ ||1 ||½ ||½ ||½ ||1 ||1 ||1 ||1 ||  9
|-
| 4 ||    ||  ½ ||½ ||1 ||* ||½ ||½ ||½ ||½ ||½ ||1 ||½ ||1 ||½ ||0 ||1  || 8½
|-
| 5 ||    ||  ½ ||½ ||½ ||½ ||* ||½ ||1 ||1 ||½ ||0 ||½ ||½ ||1 ||0 ||½  || 7½
|-
| 6 ||    ||  ½ ||½ ||½ ||½ ||½ ||* ||½ ||0 ||½ ||½ ||½ ||1 ||½ ||1 ||½ ||  7½
|-
| 7 ||    || 0 ||½ ||½ ||½ ||0 ||½ ||* ||½ ||1 ||1 ||½ ||½ ||½ ||½ ||1 ||  7½
|-
| 8 ||   || 0  || ½ ||0 ||½ ||0 ||1 ||½ ||* ||1 ||1 ||1 ||½ ||0 ||1 ||0  || 7
|-
| 9 ||    ||  0 ||½ ||½ ||½ ||½ ||½ ||0 ||0 ||* ||½ ||1 ||½ ||½ ||1 ||1 ||  7
|-
| 10 ||     ||  ½ ||½ ||½ ||0 ||1 ||½ ||0 ||0 ||½ ||* ||½ ||0 ||½ ||1 ||1  || 6½
|-
| 11 ||    ||  ½  || ½ ||½ ||½ ||½ ||½ ||½ ||0 ||0 ||½ ||* ||1 ||½ ||½ ||0  || 6
|-
| 12 ||    ||  0 ||0 ||0 ||0 ||½ ||0 ||½ ||½ ||½ ||1 ||0 ||* ||1 ||1 ||1 ||  6
|-
| 13 ||    ||  0 ||½ ||0 ||½ ||0 ||½ ||½ ||1 ||½ ||½ ||½ ||0 ||* ||0 ||½  || 5
|-
| 14 ||    ||  ½ ||0 ||0 ||1 ||1 ||0 ||½ ||0 ||0 ||0 ||½ ||0 ||1 ||* ||½  || 5
|-
| 15 ||    ||  0 ||0 ||0 ||0 ||½ ||½ ||0 ||1 ||0 ||0 ||1 ||0 ||½ ||½ ||* ||  4
|}

The prizes were: first - 5000 Francs, second - 3000 Francs, third - 2000 Francs, fourth - 1500 Francs. Non-prize winners received 80-100 Francs per point. The brilliancy prize of 500 francs, sponsored by Baron Albert Salomon von Rothschild, was won by Capablanca for his game against Dr. Bernstein.

San Sebastián 1912
The tournament was held from February 19 to March 23, 1912. This tournament was one of five that Rubinstein won in a one-year time span (San Sebastián, Breslau, Bad Pistyan, Warsaw, and Vilna).

{|class="wikitable" style="margin:  "
|  style="background:#f0f0f0;"|#
|  style="background:#f0f0f0;"|Player
|  style="background:#f0f0f0;"|1
|  style="background:#f0f0f0;"|2
|  style="background:#f0f0f0;"|3
|  style="background:#f0f0f0;"|4
|  style="background:#f0f0f0;"|5
|  style="background:#f0f0f0;"|6
|  style="background:#f0f0f0;"|7
|  style="background:#f0f0f0;"|8
|  style="background:#f0f0f0;"|9
|  style="background:#f0f0f0;"|10
|  style="background:#f0f0f0;"|11
|  style="background:#f0f0f0;"|Total
|-
| 1 ||  ||  ** ||½1 ||01 ||½1 ||½½ ||1½ ||01 ||11 ||½½ ||½1 ||½- ||12½
|-
| 2 ||  || ½0 ||** ||01 ||1½ ||0½ ||11 ||11 ||½½ ||½½ ||11 ||½- ||12
|-
| 3 ||  ||   10 ||10 ||** ||10 ||1½ ||½1 ||½½ ||½1 ||½½ ||1½ ||1- ||12
|-
| 4 ||  || ½0 ||0½ ||01 ||** ||11 ||01 ||½0 ||½½ ||11 ||11 ||1- ||11½  
|-
| 5 ||  || ½½ ||1½ ||0½ ||00 ||** ||1½ ||½1 ||½½ ||½½ ||1½ ||½- ||10
|-
| 6  || || 0½ ||00 ||½0 ||10 ||0½ ||** ||½1 ||1½ ||½½ ||11 ||1-  ||9½
|-
| 7  || || 10 ||00 ||½½ ||½1 ||½0 ||½0 ||** ||½½ ||½1 ||01 ||½-  ||8½
|-
| 8  || ||  00 ||½½ ||½0 ||½½ ||½½ ||0½ ||½½ ||** ||½½ ||1½ ||½- || 8
|-
| 9 ||  ||   ½½ ||½½ ||½½ ||00 ||½½ ||½½ ||½0 ||½½ ||** ||½½ ||½-  ||8
|-
| 10 ||  || ½0 ||00 ||0½ ||00 ||0½ ||00 ||10 ||0½ ||½½ ||** ||1- || 5
|-
| 11 ||  || ½- ||½- ||0- ||0- ||½- ||0- ||½- ||½- ||½- ||0- ||** || 3
|}

Forgacs only played the first half tournament and forfeited his last ten games.

The prizes were: first - 5000 Francs, second - 3000 Francs, third - 2000 Francs, fourth - 1500 Francs. Non-prize winners received 100 Francs per point.

References

Chess competitions
Chess in Spain
1911 in chess
1912 in chess
Sport in San Sebastián